Ken Jones Aerodrome  is an airport located  west of Port Antonio, in northeastern Jamaica. The facility is named after Jamaican civil servant and politician Kenneth Arthur Newton Jones. It serves tourist resorts in the area and local travel. 

Ken Jones Aerodrome handled approximately 8,546 passengers in 2001. The airport formerly had scheduled passenger service provided by Air Jamaica Express.

Facilities
There are no fueling facilities and the airport has no night flight operations.

Airlines and destinations
There are no scheduled services to the aerodrome.

Passengers
The following table shows the number of passengers using the airport annually from 1997 through 2001.

References

External links
 

Airports in Jamaica
Buildings and structures in Portland Parish